The Afraha Stadium is a multi-purpose stadium in Nakuru, Kenya.  It used mostly for football matches and is the home stadium of Nakuru AllStars of the Kenyan Premier League and Ulinzi Stars of the Kenyan Premier League.  The stadium holds 8,200 people and opened in 1948. The stadium is two kilometres from the famous Lake Nakuru National Park. Even though it is a football stadium, it became famous for hosting many political meetings including the GEMA promoted change the constitution series held in the 1970s. The former ruling party KANU also held many prominent meetings there during the Moi era.

References

External links
Stadium information
Frank Jasperneite page

Sport in Rift Valley Province
Football venues in Kenya
Nakuru
Multi-purpose stadiums in Kenya
Buildings and structures in Rift Valley Province